Robert Appelbaum (born 2 February 1952) is an academic specializing in early modern writing, food studies, and terrorism studies.  He is a Professor Emeritus from the Department of English at Uppsala University, in Sweden.

Biography
He received a B.A. from the University of Chicago in Tutorial Studies in 1975, an M.A. in English Literature at San Francisco State University in 1989, and a Ph.D. in English from the University of California, Berkeley, where he worked under the supervision of Stephen Greenblatt. 

His works include "Terrorism Before the Letter: Literatures of Political Violence in Britain and France, 1559–1642" and the 2011 volume, ''Dishing It Out: In Search of the Restaurant Experience' (London: Reaktion). In 2011, he left his position as a Senior Lecturer In Renaissance Studies at Lancaster University to take up a Chair as Professor of English Literature at Uppsala University.

His most recent book is at once an autobiography and a work of cultural criticism: Working the Aisles: A Life in Consumption (Winchester: Zero Books).

References
http://www.lancs.ac.uk/fass/english/profiles/Robert-Appelbaum/
http://robertappelbaum.com/
http://www.press.uchicago.edu/presssite/metadata.epl?mode=synopsis&bookkey=206065
http://www.bbc.co.uk/radio4/factual/thinkingallowed/thinkingallowed_20070110.shtml

Further reading 
 Robert Appelbaum, Literature and Utopian Politics in Seventeenth-Century England, Cambridge University Press, 2002.  
 Robert Appelbaum and John Wood Sweet, editors, Envisioning an English Empire: Jamestown and the Making of the North Atlantic World, University of Pennsylvania Press, 2005. 
 Robert Appelbaum, Aguecheek's Beef, Belch's Hiccup, and Other Gastronomic Interjections: Literature, Culture, and Food Among the Early Moderns, University of Chicago Press, 2006. 
 Robert Appelbaum, Dishing It Out: In Search of the Restaurant Experience, Reaktion Books, 2011. 

American literary critics
Living people
1952 births
University of Chicago alumni
San Francisco State University alumni
UC Berkeley College of Letters and Science alumni